Tycoon: The Commodity Market Simulation is a 1983 video game published by Blue Chip Software.

Gameplay
Tycoon is a game in which the commodities market is simulated.

Reception
Johnny Wilson reviewed the game for Computer Gaming World, and stated that "Tycoon is a superior cousin to the Millionaire stock market simulation from Blue Chip Software [...] The program is both similar and improved."

Reviews
PC Magazine - Sep 18, 1984

References

External links
Review in InCider
Article in MacUser
Article in Family Computing
Review in Electronic Games
Review in Electronic Games

1983 video games
Apple II games
Atari 8-bit family games
Business simulation games
Classic Mac OS games
Commodore 64 games
DOS games
Video games developed in the United States
Video games set in the United States